James Craft or Kraft may refer to:
James Craft, hostage to Holden-Keating Gang
James Craft, one-time owner of Oakland Square Historic District
Jamie Craft of Boston Renegades
James L. Kraft (1874–1953), Canadian-American entrepreneur
James E. Kraft, United States Army general
James Kraft (politician) (born 1941), member of the Arizona House of Representatives.

See also
James Crafts (1839–1917), American chemist
William James Craft (1886–1931), Canadian film director and screenwriter